Thomas Orr may refer to:
Tommy Orr (1924–1972), Scottish footballer
Thomas Orr (footballer) (born 1997), Stenhousemuir striker
Tom Orr (1877–1954), American driver
Thomas Orr (politician), South Africa Minister of Finance
Tom Orr, mayor of Cambridge, Ohio